The BBC is the British Broadcasting Corporation, a publicly funded national broadcaster of the United Kingdom.

BBC may also refer to:

Organisations

Broadcasting

British Broadcasting Corporation 
 BBC Radio, an operational business division and service of the British Broadcasting Corporation
 BBC News (disambiguation), various BBC services
 BBC Three (disambiguation), various BBC services
 BBC Television, a television service of the BBC
 British Broadcasting Company (1922–1926), the corporation's commercial precursor
 BBC America, an American television channel
 BBC Canada, a Canadian television channel
 BBC World Service, an international broadcaster owned and operated by the BBC

Other 

Banahaw Broadcasting Corporation, a defunct Philippine television network
Biwako Broadcasting Co., a Japanese television station

Companies
 Bangkok Bank of Commerce, a collapsed Thai bank
 BBC Chartering, a shipping company
 Billionaire Boys Club, a former Californian investment group and Ponzi scheme
 Billionaire Boys Club (clothing retailer), a fashion label
 Biman Bangladesh Airlines (ICAO code)
 Bogotá Beer Company, Colombia; see Beer in Colombia
 Brown, Boveri & Cie, a former Swiss power/automation company

Education
 Baptist Bible College (Missouri), Springfield,  US
 Bhiwani Boxing Club, India
 Biscayne Bay Campus of Florida International University, North Miami, Florida, US
 Boise Bible College, Idaho, US
 Brisbane Boys' College, Australia

Other organisations
 BBC Monthey, a Swiss basketball team
 Biplobi Bangla Congress, an Indian political party in West Bengal
 Blades Business Crew, a football hooligan gang in England
 B'nai Brith Canada
 Russian Air Force, often shortened to ВВС in Cyrillic

Computing
 BBC Micro, a 1980s home computer
BBC BASIC, a programming language
 BBCode, a message board markup language
 Bootable business card, a card-shaped CD-ROM

Other uses
 Bromobenzyl cyanide, a tear gas
 British-born Chinese
 "BBC", a song by Ming Tea
 "BBC", a song on the Jay-Z album Magna Carta Holy Grail
 Bale, Benzema, and Cristiano, Real Madrid footballers 2013-2018
 Barzagli, Bonucci, and Chiellini, Italian  footballers 2011-2017
 Toba Batak language, ISO 639-3 code
 BBC (sexual slang), the initialism of big black cock
 B. B. See, pronounced BBC, a character in The Noose